Margaret Mitchell is a neighborhood in the Buckhead Community, in the northwest part of the city of Atlanta, Georgia. It is bounded by Moore's Mill Road on the south, I-75 on the east, and the Paces neighborhood on the west.

History
The neighborhood was developed in the 1950s and was originally called Cherokee Forest.

Government
Margaret Mitchell is part of NPU A.

References

External links
Margaret Mitchell Civic Association

Neighborhoods in Atlanta